Yekaterina Leshcheva-Grigoryeva or Ekaterina Grigorieva (born April 21, 1974, Volgograd) is a Russian sprint athlete. She became the Summer Universiade champion in the 200 metres at the 1997 Games. She reached the European podium at the 2000 European Athletics Indoor Championships, taking the silver medal in the women's 200 m. She was given a two-year ban from competition in 2001.

International competitions

See also
List of doping cases in athletics

References

 

1974 births
Living people
Russian female sprinters
Olympic female sprinters
Olympic athletes of Russia
Athletes (track and field) at the 1996 Summer Olympics
Goodwill Games medalists in athletics
Competitors at the 1998 Goodwill Games
Universiade gold medalists in athletics (track and field)
Universiade gold medalists for Russia
World Athletics Championships athletes for Russia
European Athletics Championships winners
European Athletics Championships medalists
Russian Athletics Championships winners
Doping cases in athletics
Russian sportspeople in doping cases
Sportspeople from Volgograd